The Network of Concerned Historians (NCH) is an organization created to act as a bridge between human-rights organisations campaigning for censored
or persecuted historians and others concerned with the past on the one hand and the global
community of historians on the other.
The Network of Concerned Historians became affiliated with the International Students of History Association in April 2013, became an affiliated member of Scholars at Risk (SAR), located at New York University, in February 2007, and became a founding member for the Network for Education and Academic Rights in June 2011.

History
The Network of Concerned Historians was created in 1995 by Antoon De Baets, in the History Department of the University of Groningen, in the Netherlands.

Campaigns
The NCH produces Annual Reports about the domain where history and human rights intersect. In addition, the NCH collects codes of ethics of Historians and workers in related fields, such as Archivists, and Archaeologists from all over the world.

The Annual Reports have been published since 1995, and are all available in the organization's website.

The last Report was published in 2022, and covers 100 countries, including Afghanistan, Brazil. China, India, Russia and the United States.

External links
 Official website
 Around the World, Censorship of Historians is Tied to Attacks on Democracy
 Regimes Around the World are Manipulating History and Threatening Historians

References

History organizations based in the United States
Historical societies of the United States
Professional associations based in the United States